Claudia Verónica Leal Balderas (born 15 October 1977) is a Mexican road cyclist. She participated at the UCI Road World Championships on ten occasions between 2004 and 2014.

Major results
Source: 

2000
 3rd Road race, National Road Championships
2001
 3rd Time trial, National Road Championships
2004
 4th Time trial, Pan American Road Championships
2007
 6th Overall Tour Cycliste Féminin International de l'Ardèche
 7th Overall Giro della Toscana Int. Femminile – Memorial Michela Fanini
2008
 1st Stage 6 Vuelta a El Salvador
 2nd Time trial, National Road Championships
 7th Time trial, Pan American Road Championships
2009
 National Road Championships
1st  Road race
1st  Time trial
2010
 National Road Championships
1st  Road race
1st  Time trial
2011
 1st  Time trial, National Road Championships
 Pan American Games
6th Time trial
10th Road race
 8th Time trial, Pan American Road Championships
2012
 7th Time trial, Pan American Road Championships
 10th Grand Prix el Salvador
2013
 2nd Time trial, National Road Championships
2014
 1st  Time trial, National Road Championships
2015
 2nd Time trial, National Road Championships
2016
 1st  Time trial, National Road Championships
2017
 2nd Time trial, National Road Championships
2021
 2nd Time trial, National Road Championships

References

External links

1977 births
Living people
Mexican female cyclists
Cyclists at the 2003 Pan American Games
Cyclists at the 2011 Pan American Games
Place of birth missing (living people)
Pan American Games competitors for Mexico
20th-century Mexican women
21st-century Mexican women
Competitors at the 2006 Central American and Caribbean Games